The women's +78 kilograms (Heavyweight) competition at the 2002 Asian Games in Busan was held on 30 September at the Gudeok Gymnasium.

Schedule
All times are Korea Standard Time (UTC+09:00)

Results
Legend
WO — Won by walkover

Main bracket

Repechage

References
2002 Asian Games Report, Page 470

External links
 
 Official website

W79
Judo at the Asian Games Women's Heavyweight
Asian W79